José da Silva Varela (born 22 December 1991), sportingly known as Zé, is a São Toméan footballer who plays for Sporting Praia Cruz, which is playing in the São Tomé and Príncipe Championship, as a striker. He is a member of the São Tomé and Príncipe national football team.

International career

International goals
Scores and results list São Tomé and Príncipe's goal tally first.

References

External links 
 

1991 births
Living people
People from São Tomé
São Tomé and Príncipe footballers
Association football forwards
São Tomé and Príncipe international footballers
Sporting Praia Cruz players